Covered bridges in Tennessee include those listed in the following table.

See also

 List of bridges on the National Register of Historic Places in Tennessee
 World Guide to Covered Bridges

References

External links

National Society for the Preservation of Covered Bridges
Only in Your State article about the state's covered bridges

Tennessee 

covered bridges
Bridges, covered